The Trypillia Tragedy is a 1926 Soviet drama film by Alexander Anoschenko-Anoda.

Plot
The film is based on a historical incident, the massacre of a Komsomol special detachment during the Russian Civil War in Ukraine. In 1919, during Anton Denikin's offensive, the Komsomol forces faced the irregular troops of the Army of Independent Soviet Ukraine, led by the turncoat rebel Daniil Ilich Terpilo (known as Ataman Zelyony (literally "Green")).

Zelyony's men surrounded the  Komsomol forces at the village of Trypillia in Ukraine south of Kyiv, trapped them on the steep banks of the Dnieper River, and slaughtered them.

Cast
Yevgenia Petrova - Kate
Boris Bezgin - Secretary of the Komsomol District Committee
Vera Danilevich - Komsomol fighter
Vladimir Shakhovskoy - resident of the village of Trypillia
George Astafev - seminarian Daniel, member of Zelyony's gang
E. Timofeev - young Komsomol leader Mikhail Samoylovich Ratmansky

Soviet historical drama films
Soviet war drama films
Soviet silent films
Soviet black-and-white films
1920s war drama films
1920s historical drama films
Ukrainian war drama films
Ukrainian historical drama films
1926 drama films
1926 films
Ukrainian black-and-white films
Silent war drama films
Soviet-era Ukrainian films